Events from the year 1425 in France

Incumbents
 Monarch – Charles VII

Deaths
 17 September – Bonne of Artois, Duchess of Burgundy (born 1396)

References

1420s in France